Walker Corporation is an Australian privately-owned property development company.

Most notably, Walker Corporation is responsible for the development and restoration of several significant Australian sites, including King Street Wharf, Finger Wharf, Broadway Shopping Centre, and Rhodes Waterside shopping centre in Sydney.

History

The company was founded in 1964 by Lang & Alec Walker, initially as an earthmoving and civil engineering business until 1972 when Lang Walker formed The Walker Group and expanded into property development. Walker Corporation joined the Australian Securities Exchange in 1994. In 1999, Lang Walker sold his shares in Walker Corporation Ltd to Australand Holdings Limited (now Frasers Property), reserving the right to reuse the Walker Corporation name after January 2003. Lang Walker exercised that right in 2003, renaming McRoss Developments Pty Ltd to Walker Corporation. In 2006, Walker Corporation sold over A$1.1 billion worth of assets to Mirvac, retaining their industrial and some of their commercial & retail interests.

In 2011 Walker Corporation began development of Collins Square, then the largest commercial mixed-use development in Australia, with construction completed in 2019.

In 2014 Walker Corporation was selected by the Queensland Government & Redland City Council as the preferred partner to redevelop Toondah Harbour, a 67-hectare site which the government had declared a Priority Development Area located in Redland City, Queensland. The project has been a source of controversy, with parts of the proposed development area covering a Ramsar site. In August 2016 Walker Corporation used a meeting with then Minister for the Environment and Energy Josh Frydenberg to lobby for boundary changes to reduce the size of the Ramsar site, described by the company as a matter of “urgent national interest.” The company released revised plans in 2018, reducing the proposed land reclamation area by 12 hectares and reducing the impact on neighbouring Cassim Island. In 2022 the company released the project’s Environmental Impact Statement, which will be examined by the Government following public consultation.

In 2015 Walker Corporation released plans for their largest international development Senibong Cove, a 16-hectare development located in Johor Bahru, Malaysia. In 2016 the company's plans for a redevelopment of Adelaide's Festival Plaza were approved by the state's Development Assessment Commission, with revised plans including expansions to the retail component approved in late 2020.

The company is currently developing over A$30 billion worth of projects across Australia and Malaysia.

Current projects

 Collins Square: Australia’s largest commercial mixed-use development when completed in 2018, occupying a full Melbourne CBD block.

 Parramatta Square: A $3.2 billion project on a 3-hectare site in Parramatta, New South Wales, consisting of 4 commercial towers, a retail district, and public spaces.

 Riverlea: The largest residential development in South Australia’s history, comprising approximately 12,000 homes and expected to take over two decades to complete.

 Maroochydore City Centre: Australia’s largest greenfield CBD located in Maroochydore, Queensland, estimated to take 15-20 years to complete.

 Festival Tower: A $1 billion commercial & retail development and public square in the Adelaide CBD, expected to be completed in late 2023.

 Senibong Cove: A jointly-developed Malaysian masterplanned precinct in close proximity to the Johor-Singapore Causeway, containing over 8,000 homes, a 100-berth marina, and a retail precinct built on over 400 hectares of reclaimed land. Senibong Cove received the South East Asia Property Awards’ ‘Best Villa/Housing Development’ award for multiple consecutive years.
 Kokomo Private Island: A six-star private resort occupying an entire 57-hectare Fijian island, comprising 21 villas and five residences.
 Citiswich Business Park: A $1 billion Ipswich industrial estate covering 350 hectares, the largest in Queensland. 

 Main Drive Kew: A $400 million residential development on the former Kew Cottages site in the leafy Melbourne suburb of Kew. The project is a joint venture between Walker Corporation and the Victorian Government and has been the subject of several accolades, controversies, allegations, and legal disputes. Construction of stage 1 was completed in 2008 and was followed by several disputes between purchasers, consultants, and developers. The final stage was completed in 2014.

References

External links
 

Companies based in Sydney
Real estate companies established in 1972
Property management companies
Real estate companies of Australia
Australian companies established in 1972